The Shore Path is a coastal path in Bar Harbor, Maine, United States. Established in 1881, it runs along the shore of Frenchman Bay, from Ells Pier, beside Agamont Park, in the north to an east–west-running continuation of the path at the eastern end of Wayman Lane. To the west of the path, mostly in its southern section, are the properties of several of Bar Harbor's historic "cottages". Cycling is not permitted on the Shore Path.

Balance Rock, deposited during an ice age, is located on the shore beside the path.

Between 2012 and 2016, Bar Harbor's Village Improvement Association (VIA) spent $150,000 repairing and improving  of the Shore Path. This work included resurfacing the gravel path and rebuilding seawalls. A new bench commemorating the donor of Glen Mary Park, Mary Shannon, was installed in the fall of 2014. The VIA pledged another $30,000 to improve the path in front of Grant Park, which was redone in coordination with the redevelopment of the park in 2017.

Route description
From the town pier, the path runs east initially, then south after it passes the lawn of the Bar Harbor Inn and Uncle Steve's Point. Grant Park is next, just north of the Balance Rock Inn. An exit, leading to Main Street's village green via Albert Meadow, is here. Continuing, past the Tudor Revival-style John Innes Kane Cottage (built in 1904), another (less obvious) exit to Main Street, via Hancock Street, appears. The southern end of the path is marked with a turn leading to Wayman Lane.

Gallery

References

External links
The Shore Path – Bar Harbor Village Improvement Association
Shore Path – Acadia Magic

Bar Harbor, Maine
Footpaths in the United States
1881 establishments in Maine